Église Sainte-Marie de Valle-d'Orezza is a church in Valle-d'Orezza, Haute-Corse, Corsica. Its interior decoration was classified as a Historic Monument in 1976.

References

Churches in Corsica
Monuments historiques of Corsica
Buildings and structures in Haute-Corse